Amphimenia is a genus of cavibelonian solenogaster, a kind of shell-less, worm-like mollusk.

Species
 Amphimenia neapolitana (Thiele, 1889)

References

 Thiele, J. 1894 Beiträge zur vergleichenden Anatomie der Amphineurem. I. Úber einige Neapeñer Solenogastres. Zeitschr. Wissensch. Zool., 58: 222-302

External links
  Gofas, S.; Le Renard, J.; Bouchet, P. (2001). Mollusca. in: Costello, M.J. et al. (eds), European Register of Marine Species: a check-list of the marine species in Europe and a bibliography of guides to their identification. Patrimoines Naturels. 50: 180-213.
 Neave, Sheffield Airey. (1939-1996). Nomenclator Zoologicus vol. 1-10 Online.

Solenogastres